Luka Pavlović (born 10 May 1963) is a Croatian football manager.

He is the head of HNK Rijeka football academy.

Personal life
His son Mateo is a footballer who played for SCO Angers in France.

References

1963 births
Living people
People from Čapljina
Croats of Bosnia and Herzegovina
Croatian football managers
NK Hrvatski Dragovoljac managers
NK Karlovac managers
NK Zagreb managers
Croatian Football League managers
Croatian expatriate sportspeople in Moldova
Croatian expatriate sportspeople in Russia
FC Sheriff Tiraspol non-playing staff
HNK Rijeka non-playing staff